Bogdan Vasile Hauși (born 29 September 1985) is a Romanian former professional footballer who played as a defender for FC Baia Mare, Iskra-Stal, Zakarpattya Uzhgorod or FC Tiraspol, among others.

Career

Club 
Hauși debuted as senior in 2007 at Romanian club FC Baia Mare. In 2008, he was transferred to Moldovan club Iskra-Stal Rîbnița. In 2010 signed a contract with Ukrainian side FC Zakarpattya Uzhgorod, for which he played until 2011. Later Hauși played for Moldovan clubs Zimbru Chișinău, Rapid Ghidighici and FC Tiraspol. In 2015 Hauși moved to Uzbekistani side FK Buxoro.

Honours
FC Tiraspol
Divizia Națională Runner-up: 2013/2014
Moldovan Cup (1): 2012/2013
Moldovan Supercup Runner-up: 2013/2014

References

External links
 
 
 
 

1985 births
Living people
Sportspeople from Baia Mare
Romanian footballers
Association football defenders
Liga II players
Liga III players
CS Minaur Baia Mare (football) players
Moldovan Super Liga players
FC Iskra-Stal players
FC Zimbru Chișinău players
FC Rapid Ghidighici players
FC Tiraspol players
Ukrainian Premier League players
Ukrainian First League players
FC Hoverla Uzhhorod players
Uzbekistan Super League players
Buxoro FK players
Romanian expatriate footballers
Expatriate footballers in Moldova
Romanian expatriate sportspeople in Moldova
Expatriate footballers in Ukraine
Romanian expatriate sportspeople in Ukraine
Expatriate footballers in Uzbekistan